This is a list of television channels available on digital terrestrial, satellite and cable systems in Israel. Channels shown in bright green are available free-to-air with Israel DTT service, called "Idan Plus". Channels which are in a paler green can only be accessed via paid television providers.

National Networks

See also
 Television in Israel
 i24news

References

Television stations
Israel